Kurukkante Kalyanam (English: The Fox's Marriage) is a 1982 Malayalam-language comedy film directed by Sathyan Anthikad in his directorial debut and written by Dr. P. Balakrishnan. The film dwells on love that transcends age barriers. The film revolves about a shy, timid, and introverted Sivasubrahmania Hariramachandran (Sukumaran), who falls head over heels for the petite and spunky Saritha (Madhavi), regardless of an age difference of 14 years.

The film was produced by Rasheeda Rasheed under the banner of Riyas Films. The film was distributed by Soori Films. The film features original songs composed by Zero Babu and a score by Guna Singh. The cinematography of the film was handled by Anandakuttan, while the editing was done by G. Venkitaraman. The film was remade in Tamil as Aavathellam Pennale starring S. Ve. Sekhar.

Plot
Sivasubrahmanian is 32-year-old, simple but shy man who still hasn't got over a rejection from his childhood, and is an unhappy bachelor. Desperate to break away from an overbearing and spiritually-inclined father, he escapes to another town along with his best friend Kumar. He falls in love with Saritha, their new neighbor, 14 years junior to him. Saritha also happens to be his boss's daughter's best friend, who also stays in the same building.

Cast
Sukumaran... Sivasubrahmania Hariramachandran
Madhavi... Saritha
Jagathy Sreekumar... Kumar
Bahadoor... Soopi Hajiyar
Nithya... Sainaba
Meena... Amina
Sathaar... Gopi
Sankaradi... Thrivikraman
Paravoor Bharathan... Sankaran Nair
Kunchan... Dilip Kumar
Mohanlal... Sainaba's Husband

Soundtrack
The music was composed by Zero Babu and the lyrics were written by Sathyan Anthikkad.

References

External links
 

1980s Malayalam-language films
1982 romantic comedy films
1982 films
Films directed by Sathyan Anthikad
Malayalam films remade in other languages
Indian romantic comedy films